Ferdi Tayfur (born Ferdi Tayfur Turanbayburt, 15 November 1945) is a Turkish male Folk music and Arabesque musician, artist, actor, director, songwriter and screenwriter. He was born in Düzce neighbourhood of Adana, Turkey and he has led a successful career in Arabesque. The artist, who has earned nine golden certifications in total, is renowned for his songs, which he has included in motion pictures as well. In the Turkish media, he is commonly known as "Ferdi Father". Having released more than 30 albums and over 30 films, he founded Ferdifon Records in 1982 and also entered the construction sector in 2009.

Life 
Tayfur was born in Adana and his father Cumali Bey named him after his favorite voice actor Ferdi Tayfur. His father wanted his son to have a proper education, but after he was murdered when exiting a casino, Tayfur left school and led a life in poverty, with his mother marrying another man after his death. He revealed that he wanted to study but could not do so because of lack of opportunities. In his childhood, he worked as an apprentice in a candy store owned by his stepfather, and there he learned how to read. Tayfur, who later worked on the farm and contributed to the family's income, started singing at weddings during the same years. Later, he participated in Adana Radio's music contest.
Tayfur made deals with Seda Plak in 1968 to release two records, but the recordings were not well received. He then went back to Adana to work on the farm. As well, he continued to work on his music career. After a three-year break he released his new record, Huzurum Kalmadı. In 1973, he released Kır Çiçekleri under the label Görsev Plak. In 1974, he released another record Bana Gerçekleri Söyle. In 1975, he signed a new contract with Elenor Plak. After the release of Bırak Şu Gurbeti, he became widely known with the release of his song Çeşme.

Music career 
Tayfur's first album, which included songs written by himself, made a good sale in the years when he started his musical career but due to financial difficulties, he sold two songs to Elenor Plak's proprietor Atilla Alpsakarya who eventually gave them to Gülden Karaböcek. Tayfur continued to publish his records and eventually became widely known with his song "Çeşme", and in 1977 he was cast in a leading role alongside Necla Nazır in a movie with the same title. The film was watched by 12 million people at the time.
Alongside releasing albums, he gave numerous concerts. 200,000 people attended his concert in Gülhane Park in 1993.

Discography

Filmography

Clips

Books 
 Şekerci Çırağı, novel, Kora Yayın, (2003)
 Yağmur Durunca, novel, Kora Yayın, (2008) 
 Bir Zamanlar Ağaçtım, novel, Kora Yayın, (2013)
 Paraşütteki Çocuk, novel, (2014)

TV shows 
1993: Yetiş Emmioğlu, TV presenter (Show TV)
2009: Korolar Çarpışıyor, contestant (Show TV)
2009: Boynu Bükük Şarkılar, TV presenter (Kanal 7)

References 

1945 births
People from Yüreğir
Living people
Kemençe players
Turkish mandolinists
Turkish male television actors
Turkish lyricists
Idealism (Turkey)
Sitar players
Turkish drummers
Turkish male film actors
Classical bassoonists
Turkish classical guitarists
Turkish classical violinists
Turkish film score composers
Turkish tambur players
Tanbur players
Musicians of Ottoman classical music
Composers of Ottoman classical music
20th-century Turkish male actors
21st-century Turkish male actors
20th-century Turkish male musicians
21st-century Turkish male musicians
Turkish record producers
Turkish music arrangers
Turkish classical musicians
Turkish classical composers
Turkish television talk show hosts
Turkish television personalities
Turkish male songwriters
Turkish oud players
Turkish classical qanun players
Turkish folk musicians
Turkish folk-pop singers
Nationalist musicians 
Turkish Sunni Muslims
Bağlama players
Turkish classical pianists
Turkish classical flautists